Jonathan Richard Rohloff (born October 3, 1969) is an American former professional ice hockey defenseman. He was drafted in the ninth round, 186th overall, by the Boston Bruins in the 1988 NHL Entry Draft. Rohloff was born in Mankato, Minnesota, but grew up in Grand Rapids, Minnesota.

Rohloff played 150 games in the National Hockey League with the Bruins between 1994 and 1997. He scored seven goals and twenty-five assists.

His first NHL goal occurred on February 25, 1995.  It was Boston's only goal in the team's 1-1 tie with the Quebec Nordiques.

Career statistics

Regular season and playoffs

International

Awards and honors

External links

1969 births
Living people
American men's ice hockey defensemen
Boston Bruins draft picks
Boston Bruins players
Cincinnati Cyclones (IHL) players
Ice hockey players from Minnesota
Kansas City Blades players
Kentucky Thoroughblades players
Minnesota Duluth Bulldogs men's ice hockey players
Providence Bruins players
Sportspeople from Grand Rapids, Minnesota
Sportspeople from Mankato, Minnesota